Merethe Trøan (born 19 May 1970, Trondheim) is a Norwegian singer, best known for her participation in the 1992 Eurovision Song Contest.

In her teens, Trøan and her sister were members of vocal group Pastel together with two brothers (not related to the Trøans).  In 1985, Pastel took part in the Norwegian Eurovision Song Contest selection, Melodi Grand Prix, with the song "Ring Ring Ring" finishing third. Pastel released one self-titled LP before disbanding.  In 1992, Trøan returned to MGP as a solo artist, and this time was successful with the song "Visjoner" being chosen as the Norwegian entry for the 37th Eurovision Song Contest, held in Malmö, Sweden on 9 May.  "Visjoner" did not prove very successful, managing only 18th place of 23 entries, although Trøan's performance is remembered for a spontaneous giggle midway through the song.

Trøan subsequently took up work as a voice actor, her credits including the Norwegian versions of Disney's Beauty and the Beast and The Jungle Book 2.

References 

 

1970 births
Living people
Eurovision Song Contest entrants for Norway
Eurovision Song Contest entrants of 1992
Musicians from Trondheim
Melodi Grand Prix winners
Norwegian voice actresses
21st-century Norwegian singers
21st-century Norwegian women singers